Aavik is an Estonian and Norwegian surname. In Estonian Aavik is a variation of Haavik, meaning "aspen forest". Notable people with the surname include:

Arvi Aavik (born 1969), Estonian wrestler
Asbjørn Aavik (1902–1997), Norwegian Lutheran missionary
Edgar Eduard Aavik (1913–1998), Estonian-Australian sculptor, member of Six Directions
Evald Aavik (born 1941), Estonian actor
Johannes Aavik (1880–1973), Estonian philologist
Juhan Aavik (1884–1982), Estonian composer
Priidu Aavik (1905–1991), Estonian painter
Priit Aavik (born 1994), Estonian swimmer

Estonian-language surnames
Norwegian-language surnames